Corvette Racing is an American auto racing team established in 1999 by General Motors and Pratt & Miller for the purposes of competing in sports car racing internationally.  Corvette Racing is an official racing program for General Motors and their Chevrolet Corvette production car, having utilized four generations of the Corvette to develop racing cars, although racing programs involving the Corvette have been endorsed by General Motors to varying degrees since 1956.  Corvette Racing has had multiple successes across multiple championships, including eight victories at the 24 Hours of Le Mans, four victories at the 24 Hours of Daytona, ten championships in the American Le Mans Series, and five championships in the WeatherTech SportsCar Championship, of which they are the defending champions after 2021.  Corvette Racing currently competes in the IMSA WeatherTech SportsCar Championship and the FIA World Endurance Championship with the Chevrolet Corvette C8.R.

References

External links
 Corvette Racing 
 Pratt Miller

American Le Mans Series teams
WeatherTech SportsCar Championship teams
24 Hours of Le Mans teams
American auto racing teams
General Motors
Chevrolet
Chevrolet Corvette
1999 establishments in the United States
FIA World Endurance Championship teams
Auto racing teams established in 1999